Bhidea is a genus of Indian plants in the grass family.

 Species
 Bhidea borii Deshp., V.Prakash & N.P.Singh
 Bhidea burnsiana Bor 
 Bhidea fischeri Sreek. & B.V.Shetty

See also
 List of Poaceae genera

References

Andropogoneae
Poaceae genera
Flora of India (region)